James Hagan (born 1904 in Leadgate, County Durham) was an English prelate of the Catholic Church who served as bishop of the Roman Catholic Diocese of Makurdi. He was appointed bishop in 1960. He died in 1976.

References 

1904 births
1976 deaths
English Roman Catholic bishops
People from Leadgate, County Durham
Roman Catholic bishops of Makurdi